The 2020 O'Byrne Cup was a Gaelic football tournament played by county teams of Leinster GAA in December 2019 and January 2020.

Longford were the surprise winners.

Competition format

One team (Dublin) receives a bye to the semi-finals. The remaining ten teams are drawn to play in one group of four teams and two groups of three teams.

In the four-team group, each team plays the other teams in their group once. Two points are awarded for a win and one for a draw.

In the two three-team groups, each team plays the other teams in their group once. Each team also plays one game against a team from the other three-team group. Two points are awarded for a win and one for a draw.

The three group winners advance to the semi-finals.

Group stage

Group 1

Longford are ranked ahead of Kildare as they won the head-to-head match between the teams
Carlow are ranked ahead of Wicklow as they won the head-to-head match between the teams

Three-team groups

Group 2

Group 3

Cross-group games
The three teams in Group 2 play the three teams in Group 3 with each team having a single game.

Knockout stage

Semi-finals

The three group winners plus the team given a bye (Dublin) compete in the semi-finals. The two winners advance to the final.

Final

References

External links
Official site

O'Byrne Cup
O'Byrne Cup